Shamil (Arabic: شَامِل shāmil) is a lesser common masculine Arabic name. The name is usually from the adjective which have several correlated meanings from the Arabic "complete, comprehensive, universal" but could also mean "embodying, profound".

Therefore, the adjective stems from the Arabic verb shamila (Arabic: شَمِلَ) meaning "to comprehend, include, everything" but which is linked to the other meanings:

1) "union, unity, correlation, bond"

2) "universal, predominant, embrace"

The feminine form of the name is Shamila (Arabic: شَامِلَة shāmilah).

The name may refer to:

Geography
Shamil, Hormozgan, a village in Hormozgan Province, Iran
Shamil-e Bala, a village in Hormozgan Province, Iran
Shamil Rural District, a rural district in Hormozgan Province, Iran

Name
 Shamil, 3rd Imam of Dagestan (1797–1871), leader of resistance to Russian rule over the Caucasus
 Shamil Abbyasov (born 1957), Soviet Kyrgyzstani retired long jumper and triple jumper
 Shamil Asgarov, Azeri scholar
 Shamil Asildarov (born 1983), Russian footballer
 Shamil Basayev (1969–2006), militant Islamist and a leader of the Chechen rebel movement
 Shamil Isayev (born 1964), Russian retired footballer
 Shamil Khan, Pakistani film actor
 Shamil Lakhiyalov (born 1979), Russian footballer
 Shamil Saidov (born 1982), Russian footballer
 Shamil Sabirov (born 1959), Soviet Olympic champion light flyweight boxer
 Shamil Serikov (1956–1989), Soviet Olympic champion wrestler
 Shamil Shetekauri (born 1955), Georgian scientist
 Shamil Zavurov (born 1984), Russian mixed martial arts fighter

See also
 Samuel (name)
 Shamil Bank of Bahrain